Second Story is the second studio album of the Japanese pop music duo ClariS, released on June 26, 2013 by SME Records. The album contains 12 music tracks, three of which were previously released on three of ClariS' singles. Three different editions of the album were released: a regular CD version and two CD+DVD limited editions. Second Story peaked at No. 6 on the Japanese Oricon weekly albums chart.

Four of the songs were used as theme songs for various media: "Wake Up" was used as the opening theme to the 2012 anime television series Moyashimon Returns; "With You" was the theme song to 2013 video game Exstetra; "Luminous" used as the opening theme to the first two Puella Magi Madoka Magica anime films; and "Reunion" was the opening theme to the 2013 anime television series Ore no Imōto ga Konna ni Kawaii Wake ga Nai..

Release and reception
Second Story was released on June 26, 2013 in three editions: a regular CD version and two CD+DVD limited editions. The DVD from both limited editions contained music videos of the songs "Wake Up", "With You", "Luminous" and "Reunion", as well as a collection of television commercials featuring advertising "Wake Up", "Luminous", "Reunion" and Second Story. One of the limited edition versions also came bundled with Graphig paper figures of ClariS, while the other limited edition version came with a special album sleeve featuring art of ClariS drawn by Hideyuki Morioka of Shaft. For the week of June 24, 2013 on Oricon's weekly albums chart, Second Story was reported to have sold 38,940 copies in its first week of sales, peaking at No. 6, and charted for 13 weeks.

Track listing

Personnel

ClariS
Clara – vocals
Alice – vocals

Additional musicians
Hiroomi Shitara – guitar
Atsushi Yuasa – bass

Production
Daisuke Katsurada – executive producer
Chiemi Kominami – executive producer
Shunsuke Muramatsu – executive producer
Ken'ichi Nakata – executive producer
Tadayuki Kominami – producer
Dai Ishikawa – director
Takashi Koiwa – mixer
Yuji Chinone – mastering
Shinobu Matsuoka – management
Kaori Kimura – products coordination
Tatsuo Murai – art direction, design

References

2013 albums
ClariS albums
Japanese-language albums
Sony Music albums